Matero is a constituency of the National Assembly of Zambia. It covers the north-western section of Lusaka in Lusaka District, including the suburb of Matero.

List of MPs

References

Constituencies of the National Assembly of Zambia
1973 establishments in Zambia
Constituencies established in 1973